Bab Duri (also Romanized as Bāb Dūrī) is a village in Dasht-e Khak Rural District, in the Central District of Zarand County, Kerman Province, Iran. At the 2006 census, its population was 106, in 26 families.

References 

Populated places in Zarand County